Piquerobi is a municipality in the state of São Paulo in Brazil. The population is 3,699 (2020 est.) in an area of 483 km². The elevation is 440 m.

The municipality contains part of the  Rio do Peixe State Park, created in 2002.

References

Municipalities in São Paulo (state)